Jermaine McGillvary (born 16 May 1988) is an English professional rugby league footballer who plays on the  for the Huddersfield Giants in the Super League. He has played for the England Knights, England and Great Britain at international level.

He has spent time on loan from Huddersfield at Batley and Barrow in the Championship.

Background
McGillvary was born in Huddersfield, West Yorkshire, England, and he is of Grenadian descent.

McGillvary is a product of the Giants' academy system.

Playing career
After signing for the Huddersfield Giants, McGillvary was sent out on loan to Batley for the 2009 Co-operative Championship, a season which saw him progress as a talent and earned him selection in the 2009 Championship team of the season.

Batley/Batley Bulldogs' "most tries in a match" record of 5-tries, is jointly held by; Joe Oakland (1908), Tommy 'Dowdy' Brannan (against Swinton at Mount Pleasant, Batley on Saturday 17 January 1920), Jim Wale (1926 and 1927), Tommy Oldroyd (against Highfield on 6 March 1994), Ben Feehan (against Halifax on 18 August 2008), and Jermaine McGillvary (against Whitehaven on 24 May 2009).

He made his first-grade début in 2010, starting on the right wing against Bradford in round 16 of 2010's Super League XV.
In 2011, McGillvary was awarded the Albert Goldthorpe Rookie of the Year Medal.

In the 2013 Super League season, McGillvary played 27 games and scored 19 tries as Huddersfield claimed the League Leaders Shield for the first time in 81 years.  Huddersfield would ultimately fall short of a grand final appearance that year.
On 4 May 2014, McGillvary made his 100th appearance for Huddersfield. Fittingly he scored a try in his team's crucial one point win over third placed Super League team, the Castleford Tigers.

McGillvary finished as Super League's top try scorer in 2015, with 27, and earned selection in the Super League Dream Team.
On 4 October 2020, McGillvary scored two tries in a 32-22 victory over Hull KR. In the process, he moved into the Super League's top ten highest ever try scorers list.

In round 15 of the 2021 Super League season, he scored four tries in Huddersfield's 40-26 victory over Hull F.C.
In the 2022 Challenge Cup semi-final, McGillvary earned man of the match honours as Huddersfield defeated Hull Kingston Rovers 25-4 at Elland Road.
On 28 May 2022, McGillvary played for Huddersfield in their 2022 Challenge Cup Final loss against Wigan.  McGillvary scored a second half try during the match.  In round 18 of the Super League XXVII season, McGillvary scored two tries for Huddersfield in a 30-18 victory over Salford at Magic Weekend.

International career
McGillvary's was selected in Steve McNamara's 24-man England team for their test series against New Zealand. He made his début for England in the decisive final test-match at the DW Stadium.

The following year, McGillvary was selected in the England squad for the 2016 Four Nations. Before the tournament, England played a test match against France in which McGillvary scored a try in England's 40-6 win.

Following the 2017 season, McGillvary was named in Wayne Bennett's England squad for the World Cup in Australia.

McGillvary played on the wing in England's 6-0 defeat by Australia in the 2017 Rugby League World Cup final.  He finished the tournament with seven tries in five games and ran more meters than any other player in the tournament.

In 2018 he was selected for England against France at the Leigh Sports Village.

He was selected in England 9s squad for the 2019 Rugby League World Cup 9s.

He was selected in squad for the 2019 Great Britain Lions tour of the Southern Hemisphere. He made his Great Britain test debut in the defeat by Tonga.

On 25 June 2021 he played for the Combined Nations All Stars, and scored a try, in their 26-24 victory over England, staged at the Halliwell Jones Stadium, Warrington, as part of England’s 2021 Rugby League World Cup preparation. McGillvary subsequently announced his international retirement in June 2022.

References

External links
Huddersfield Giants profile
SL profile
Statistics at rlwc2017.com

1988 births
Living people
Barrow Raiders players
Batley Bulldogs players
Black British sportspeople
Combined Nationalities rugby league team players
England Knights national rugby league team players
England national rugby league team players
English sportspeople of Grenadian descent
English rugby league players
Great Britain national rugby league team players
Huddersfield Giants players
Rugby league fullbacks
Rugby league players from Huddersfield
Rugby league wingers